was a town located in Katsuta District, Okayama Prefecture, Japan.

As of 2003, the town had an estimated population of 7,494 and a density of 166.90 persons per km2. The total area was 44.90 km2.

On February 28, 2005, Shōboku, along with the town of Kamo, the village of Aba (both from Tomata District), and the town of Kume (from Kume District), was merged into the expanded city of Tsuyama and no longer exists as an independent municipality.

Geography

Adjoining municipalities
Okayama Prefecture
Tsuyama
Kamo
Shōō
Nagi
Tottori Prefecture
Chizu

Education
Niino Elementary School
Hirodo Elementary School
Shōkamo Elementary School
Shōboku Junior High School

Transportation

Road
National highways:
Route 53
Route 429
Prefectural roads:
Okayama Prefectural Route 67 (Shōō-Shōboku)
Okayama Prefectural Route 348 (Horisaka-Shōboku)
Okayama Prefectural Route 415 (Kumon-Shōō)
Okayama Prefectural Route 450 (Miura-Shōboku)

External links
Official website of Tsuyama in Japanese (some English content)

Dissolved municipalities of Okayama Prefecture
Tsuyama